Neeti-Nijayiti is a 1972 Indian Telugu-language comedy film directed by Singeetam Srinivasa Rao and produced by M. Lakshmikanta Reddy and H. V. Sanjeeva Reddy. The film stars Krishnam Raju and Kanchana. The dialogues were written by Pingali Nagendra Rao. The music was composed by S. Rajeswara Rao. The lyrics were penned by C. Narayana Reddy. It is the debut film of Singeetam Srinivasa Rao.

Cast
Krishnam Raju
Kanchana
Gummadi
Nagabhushanam

Soundtrack
"Bhale Mazaale"
"Babullaaga Bratakalante"
"Dubu Dubu Dub"
"Maatalakandani Bhavalu"
"Nee Madilo Daagina Paata"

References

External links

1972 films
1970s Telugu-language films
Indian drama films
Films directed by Singeetam Srinivasa Rao
Films scored by S. Rajeswara Rao
1972 directorial debut films